Cape Juncal is a prominent cape forming the northwestern extremity of D'Urville Island, in the Joinville Island group, Antarctica. The name appears on an Argentine government chart of 1957 and was applied in remembrance of the Argentine naval victory of 1827 at the Battle of Juncal.

References

Headlands of the Joinville Island group